The Emirate of Nejd and Hasa was the second iteration of the Third Saudi State from 1913 to 1921. It was a monarchy led by the House of Saud. The state was formed after Saudi forces seized Al-Ahsa from the control of the Ottoman garrison, during the Conquest of al-Hasa. It was the direct antecedent of the Sultanate of Nejd, and a legal predecessor of modern-day Saudi Arabia.

History

See also
 History of Saudi Arabia
 Unification of Saudi Arabia
 Emirate of Diriyah
 Emirate of Nejd
 Emirate of Jabal Shammar
 Kingdom of Hejaz
 Kingdom of Hejaz and Nejd

References

1902 establishments in Asia
1921 disestablishments in Asia
Former Arab states
Nejd
History of Nejd
History of Saudi Arabia
Najd
Ottoman Arabia
States and territories established in 1902
States and territories disestablished in 1921
Former emirates